Holland's Got Talent is the Dutch member of the Got Talent television show franchise. The ninth season of Holland's Got Talent began on 28 April 2017.

Netherlands
2017 Dutch television seasons